Charles Page (June 2, 1860 – December 27, 1926) was a businessman and important philanthropist in the early history of Tulsa, Oklahoma. After his father died when Page was an 11-year-old boy in Wisconsin, he left school early to try to help support his mother and siblings. He had years of struggle before succeeding in business and striking oil in 1905 in Oklahoma.

Wanting to help other widows and children, in 1911 Page founded the Sand Springs Home. Concurrently, he founded the city of Sand Springs, Oklahoma as a model community to support the home, attracting industry and businesses. In 1987 he was posthumously inducted into the Tulsa Hall of Fame.

Biography

Early life
Charles Page was born in 1860 in Arnott, Wisconsin, near Stevens Point, to James William and Mary (Gottrey) Page. He dropped out of school in 1870 and began working on a freight wagon after his father became too ill to work. The father died when Charles was eleven years old. Thereafter, he took care of his mother and four younger siblings.

For many years, Page worked at a series of jobs in an attempt to support his family. In the early 1870s, he helped his mother cook for Wisconsin Central Railway workers. Additionally, he worked as a railway dispatcher and clerked in a general store. In 1876-1877, he worked as a lumberjack and logger. In 1879, he became a policeman in Ashland, Wisconsin. In the following two years, he became chief of police for Tower, Minnesota, and then went to work for the Pinkerton National Detective Agency.

He married his first wife, Lucy, in Duluth, Minnesota in 1881. She already had a son named Willie, whom Page adopted. The family moved to Ellensburg, Washington during the 1880s, on the east side of the state, where he became an agent for the Northern Pacific Railroad. Moving to Tacoma west of the Cascade Mountains, he tried and failed as a hotel owner and as a commodities trader. From 1888 to 1890, Page went to Canada searching for gold. During these years, he continued to send money to support his mother, until her death in 1891. During the 1890s, he worked in the mining industry in Washington, Idaho, Colorado, and Canada. He apparently made some money, but lost all his savings in the Panic of 1893. In 1900, he moved to Colorado Springs, Colorado, where he got into real estate development, oil well drilling, and investing in power plants.

Move to Oklahoma
In 1901 Charles, Lucy and their son moved to Oklahoma City, then in Oklahoma Territory. They lived there until 1903, when they moved to Tulsa, then a boom town in Indian Territory. Page bought a hotel and began an independent oil drilling operation. His initial wells were unsuccessful.

In 1905 his well named "The Taneha" began producing 2,000 barrels per day. Its success helped Page make his first million dollars. Another of his wells hit natural gas in the Glenn Pool field. Lucy Page died of cancer in 1906.

Founding of Sand Springs
Page never forgot how his mother had struggled in poverty to keep her family together after her husband had died. In the 19th and early 20th centuries, there were few social resources to help support orphans and widows.  He knew first-hand that fatherless children often had to forgo a school education to help support themselves or their families by working full-time, getting stuck in menial jobs. Given his recent economic gains, Page began to think how he could help others caught in the situation of his own mother and family. He envisioned creating a planned community where widows and orphans could live and be supported to become more productive members of society.

In 1908, he purchased a quarter section of land to the west of Tulsa. Soon, he acquired adjoining properties. On this land, he eventually founded a town that he named Sand Springs. He used part of the land to found and build the Sand Springs Home and helped establish various schools in West Tulsa, including Berryhill.

A generous philanthropist, he contributed to various charities in Tulsa including the Salvation Army. He quickly formed a friendship with the Tulsa Salvation Army captain, Brinton F. Breeding, and soon persuaded him to work in developing the land for the envisioned orphanage.

On July 22, 1909, Page married his second wife, Lucile Rayburn, in Denver, Colorado. They returned to Tulsa, where he had built a house at Third Street and Olympia Avenue. In 1912, they adopted a baby girl named Mary Ann. In 1915, the family moved to a new home at 810 N Main Avenue in Sand Springs.

Sand Springs Home and Widows' Colony
In May 1909, Page rescued 21 orphans from a bankrupt orphanage in Tulsa, legally adopted them, and put Breeding in charge of a home for them. Thereafter, he referred to the orphans as his "kids", and they referred to him as "Dad." Breeding served as superintendent of the Home until 1948.

The Sand Springs Home is both the name of the organization that Charles Page founded, to care for orphans and widows after he died, and the name of the building to house the orphans. The main dormitory was built in 1918. The children were assigned matrons to watch after them. In the dining area, each family of children were given their own table so they could eat together. When Page was alive, he often preferred to eat with "his kids" at their tables, rather than sit at the main table with the other adults. By the early 21st century, operations had changed. The few children who live at the home were moved into cottages, which were built around the old home dormitory, in order to have smaller-scaled living quarters. The old dormitory was demolished in 2006 to allow construction of a new recreation center for the home.

In 1912, Page began the construction of a widows' colony for widowed and divorced women with children to support. Forty three-room shotgun houses were built to house families. As years passed and the old colony homes began to fall into disrepair, they were replaced with new two-bedroom brick cottages. A chapel and a nursery were also constructed at the colony. Each house was provided with free utilities and rent, and a quart of milk per child per day. In order for a woman and her family to live in the colony, she had to have at least one child still in school, including college; her children had to maintain a "C" average in school; and they had to observe all the colony rules of behavior.

Shell Creek

Page owned the Sand Springs Bottling Company, which was the dominant supplier of fresh water for domestic consumption. By 1920, he had built a dam on Shell Creek, which created Shell Lake, near Sand Springs. He proposed to sell fresh water to the city of Tulsa. His proposal competed with the alternative of building a dam on Spavinaw Creek. Heated competition ensued between the two major newspapers, Tulsa Democrat (owned by Page), which supported the Shell Creek proposal, and the Tulsa World (owned by Eugene Lorton), which supported the Spavinaw plan. Page's proposal was rejected when tests showed that the quantity of water he could produce at Shell Creek was inadequate to meet Tulsa's expected needs.

Tulsa Race Massacre Aftermath
Many Black families spent the winter of 1921–1922 in tents as they worked to rebuild. Charles Page was commended for his philanthropic efforts in the wake of the riot in the assistance of 'destitute people of color. He donated land and lumber so that black families could build homes in Sand Springs, helping them rebuild their lives in the wake of the Tulsa Race Massacre that occurred May 31 - June 3, 1921. He also took in abandoned children into his orphanage whose parents were killed. He spent the last years of his life trying to help give African-Americans who relocated to Sand Springs, Oklahoma a place free from the Ku Klux Klan which was in every facet of Tulsa government at that time.

Industrial development
Page continually campaigned to attract companies to move to Sand Springs in order to provide jobs in the community for his "kids". Industries in early Sand Springs included: Sheffield Steel, Kerr Glass Company, Southwestern porcelain, Commander Mills (a cotton mill), and Sinclair Prairie Refinery.

Death and legacy
Page died of influenza on December 27, 1926. Charles (followed by his wife Lucile Page) was entombed at Woodland Cemetery in Sand Springs.

The main street of Sand Springs was named "Charles Page Boulevard" in his honor. This street connects Sand Springs to Tulsa, where it becomes West Third Street.

In the town's center, a statue of Page was installed. The Sand Springs Home continues to help families and children in the 21st century. The local high school is named Charles Page High School in his honor. There are also a park and a library named for him in Sand Springs.

In 1987, Page was posthumously inducted into Tulsa's Hall of Fame.

References

Clark, Opal. A Fool's Enterprise. Dexter Publishing Company: Sand Springs, OK, 1992.

External links
Horn, Nina A. (1987) 1987 Hall of Fame Inductee: Charles Page, Tulsa Historical Society.
"Oklahoma Man Built a Town for Widows", The New York Times, 12 September 1915.
Interview with Opal Moss, resident of Charles Page’s Children’s Home, Voices of Oklahoma, June 2015.

Philanthropists from Oklahoma
People from Stockton, Wisconsin
Businesspeople from Tulsa, Oklahoma
People from Sand Springs, Oklahoma
1860 births
1926 deaths
People from Ellensburg, Washington
American city founders